Aubin Hueber (born 5 April 1967, in Tarbes) is a former French rugby union player and a current coach. He played for the French national team as a scrum half (1.75 m for 75 kg).

From 2003 to 2006, he was a player-coach at the Rugby Club of Toulon winning the French Pro D2, in 2005. In October 2008, he returned to Toulon and coached with Tana Umaga and Philippe Saint-André. He leaves the club in 2011. He then became a federal coach within the French Rugby Federation from 2015 to 2021. He played as a scrum-half. His family from paternal side was of Austrian German ancestry.

He first played at Stadoceste Tarbais, moving to Stade Bagnérais, in 1984, where he premiered in the first team and played until 1988. He then played for FC Lourdes (1988/89-1990/91), RC Toulon (1991/92-1999/00), SU Agen Lot-et-Garonne (2000/01), Tarbes Pyrénées Rugby (2001/02-2002/03) and RC Toulon (2003/04 to 2005/06), as player-coach. He won the Top 14, in 1992, with RC Toulon.

Hueber had 21 caps for France, from 1990 to 2000. He played four times at the Five Nations/Six Nations, in 1992, 1993, 1995 and 2000, being a member of the winning squad in 1992. He also played at the 1995 Rugby World Cup .

Playing Career

In club 

 1974-1984 : Stadoceste tarbais
 1984-1988 : Stade Bagnérais
 1988-1991 : FC Lourdes
 1991-2000 : RC Toulon
 2000-2001: SU Agen
 2001-2003 : Tarbes Pyrénées
 2003-2006 : RC Toulon (as a coach-player)

National team 
He played his first test match for the French national team on June 30, 1990 against the Australian team and his last one on May 28, 2000 against the Romanian team.

Coaching Career 

 2003-2006 : RC Toulon (associated with Thierry Louvet)
 2006-2008 : French Amateur Team
 2008-2011: RC Toulon (associated with Tana Umaga, then Philippe Saint-André)
 2015-2017: French Under-19 team
 2018: French Under-20 Development Team
 2019: France Under-20 team
 2020-2021 : French U18 team
 2021-2022: US seynoise (junior team)

Since 2022, he is director of rugby of the new women's club founded by the teams around Toulon, the Rugby club Toulon Provence Méditerranée.

Achievements

Playing Career

In club 

 With RC Toulon

French first division championship : Champion (1) : 1992

In National team 
 23 selections with the French national team between 1990 and 2000

 Five/Six Nations Tournaments played: 1992, 1993 (winner), 1995, 2000
 Semi-finalist at the 1995 World Cup in South Africa
 3 selections with the French Barbarians
 1 selection with the British Barbarians
 Oscar du Midi Olympique : Silver

Coaching Career 

 French Pro D2 Champion: 2005 with Rugby Club Toulon
 Winner of the World Junior Rugby Championship in 2019 with the French U20 rugby team

External links
Aubin Hueber International Statistics

1967 births
Living people
Sportspeople from Tarbes
French rugby union players
French rugby union coaches
Rugby union scrum-halves
RC Toulonnais coaches
RC Toulonnais players
France international rugby union players
French people of German descent
Tarbes Pyrénées Rugby players